Brian Patterson (born 28 June 1937) is an Australian former cricketer. He played sixteen first-class matches for Tasmania between 1958 and 1973.

See also
 List of Tasmanian representative cricketers

References

External links
 

1937 births
Living people
Australian cricketers
Tasmania cricketers
Cricketers from Hobart